Rhabdinopora is a genus of graptolites belonging to the family Anisograptidae. It is the earliest planktic graptolite and is presumably the ancestor of all later planktic graptoloids. Some species identified as the first planktid graptolite are:

Rhabdinopora proparabola
Rhabdinopora praeparabola
Rhabdinopora parabola
Rhabdinopora flabelliformis

References

Graptolite genera
Ordovician animals of Asia
Paleozoic life of Newfoundland and Labrador